Benjamin Le Montagner (born 16 June 1988 in Léhon) is a French former professional road cyclist, who competed for  in 2013 and 2014. His brother Maxime is also a cyclist.

Major results
2012
 1st Stage 1 Tour de Bretagne Cycliste

References

External links

1988 births
Living people
French male cyclists